Kirsten Drysdale (born 1984) is an Australian television presenter and journalist.

Drysdale was born and raised in Mackay, Queensland.

Before beginning her career at the ABC, Drysdale worked for a production company in Brisbane that produced documentaries and multimedia for museums and exhibitions. During this time, she was also pursuing a sporting career, playing hockey for the Queensland Scorchers. After suffering an injury, she successfully applied for a position in the ABC television comedy and current affairs programme, Project NEXT, which was later renamed Hungry Beast.

She was a researcher and presenter for Hungry Beast and a researcher for The Hamster Wheel, The Hamster Decides and The Gruen Transfer. She has also occasionally appeared on Radio National, where she hosted Talking Shop,  a weekly consumer psychology program. The series ended on August 5, 2014. Drysdale has also written for Crikey, The Feed (Australian TV series) and The Global Mail. She was a writer and one of the main presenters on the ABC consumer affairs comedy programme, The Checkout.
In 2020 Drysdale co-hosted Reputation Rehab with Zoe Norton Lodge,  a TV series discussing the rehabilitation of reputations of people caught in scandals and controversies. 

Drysale's memoir, I Built No Schools in Kenya: A Year of Unmitigated Madness, was published in January 2019 by Vintage Australia.

References

External links

Profile on ABC Radio National website

Australian television presenters
Australian women television presenters
Australian female field hockey players
Living people
People from Mackay, Queensland
1984 births
21st-century Australian women